Flavio Cobolli (born 6 May 2002) is an Italian professional tennis player. He has a career high ATP singles ranking of World No. 133 achieved on 25 July 2022. He also has a career high ATP doubles ranking of World No. 316 achieved on 11 April 2022.

Junior career
Cobolli won the 2020 French Open boys' doubles title with Dominic Stricker.

Professional career

2021: ATP debut and first win, Two Challenger finals, Top 250 debut
Cobolli won his first ATP match on his debut at the 2021 Emilia-Romagna Open in Parma as a wildcard defeating World No. 92 Marcos Giron. As a result he reached a new career-high of World No. 386 on 31 May 2021.

In August he reached his second Challenger final in Barletta, Italy where he lost to compatriot Giulio Zeppieri. As a result he entered the top 300 at No. 281 on 30 August 2021. He reached the top 250 at No. 243 on 4 October 2021.

He was named as alternate at the 2021 Next Generation ATP Finals.

2022: Maiden Challenger title, top 150 debut
He reached a new career high in the top 200 on 10 January 2022 at No. 199.
In March, he won his maiden Challenger title at the 2022 Zadar Open in Croatia. As a result he reached the top 150 on 4 April 2022 at World No. 147.

Junior Grand Slam finals

Boys' doubles

Challenger and World Tennis Tour Finals

Singles 5 (2-3)

References

External links

2002 births
Living people
Italian male tennis players
French Open junior champions
Grand Slam (tennis) champions in boys' doubles
Sportspeople from Florence
Tennis players from Rome
21st-century Italian people